Charles Fletcher Janerette, Jr. (December 1, 1938 - October 26, 1984) was an American football defensive tackle. He played college football at Penn State and spent six seasons playing professional football with the Los Angeles Rams, New York Giants, New York Jets, and Denver Broncos. Janerette was killed in 1984 after being shot by a police officer.

References

1938 births
1984 deaths
Penn State Nittany Lions football players
Los Angeles Rams players
New York Giants players
New York Jets players
Denver Broncos players
African Americans shot dead by law enforcement officers in the United States
Deaths by firearm in Pennsylvania